Art Film Fest, previously known as Artfilm, is an annual international film festival founded in Trenčianske Teplice, Slovakia in 1993, shortly after the dissolution of Czechoslovakia. The first event was held on 14 June 1993, under the auspices of UNESCO. It is the longest continuously running international film festival in the country.

In 2016, 23 years into its history, the festival was relocated to Košice, Slovakia's second largest city. The event traditionally takes place from 14 to 22 June and includes autograph signings, discussions, musical performances, and workshops.

History
Artfilm was created by film director Petr Hledík, who has been the festival's longtime artistic director. According to Hledík, at the beginning of the 1990s, the Koliba film studios in Bratislava were in decline, funding for Slovak cinematography was rapidly dwindling, and films almost stopped being made.

1993

The first festival was held on 14 June 1993 in the spa town of Trenčianske Teplice, under the auspices of UNESCO. It was dedicated to films focused on the Baroque period, as 1992 had been the International Year of the Baroque, and many films were made on the subject. In reaction to the breakup of Czechoslovakia, the festival's organisers decided to create a retrospective of documentary film work throughout the Czechoslovak era. That year, the celebrity guest of honour was British avant-garde filmmaker Peter Greenaway, and the festival drew only 200–300 attendees.

1995

As time went on, the organisers became increasingly aware that limiting the festival to documentaries was an unnecessary constraint, and they consequently widened its scope. In 1995, the event achieved its first major milestone: shifting focus to a presentation of films concerning art and artists. 1995 was also the year when the first Actor's Mission award was bestowed, going to Italian actor Franco Nero.

1997

In 1997, the festival's screenings expanded to the nearby city of Trenčín, and a feature film competition was introduced.

2001

Artfilm began awarding a variety of Slovak and international film professionals with the Golden Camera award for notable contributions to the filmmaking craft. The award has been received by numerous renowned cinema figures, including Roman Polanski, Jean-Claude Carriére, Emir Kusturica, Ettore Scola, Andrei Konchalovsky, Ulrich Seidl, Andrzej Wajda, Martin Hollý, Juraj Jakubisko, and Dušan Hanák.

2002

Artfilm began to define itself as a festival of film artistry, and since then, it has focused on feature films from around the world. 2002 also saw the arrival of the open-air cinema known as the Čadík Brothers' Travelling Cinematograph.

2005

In 2005, the festival was subsumed by the production house Forza, and actor and singer Milan Lasica became its president, with Hledík as vice president.

2007

The festival celebrated its fifteen-year anniversary in 2007, having accumulated 105 total festival days and screened over 1,500 feature, medium-length, and short films, as well as animated, documentary, and experimental works.

2009

Peter Nágel became the new program director in 2009, and the festival changed its name to Art Film Fest. This was accompanied by a marked revival of audience interest, with the event attracting roughly 25,000 visitors.

2016

In 2016, after 23 years, Art Film Fest changed its location, moving to the second-biggest city in Slovakia, Košice. Reasons included the festival's future prospects warranting improved conditions for further development, in the form of more convenient, comfortable, and varied cinema infrastructure, and in order to meet the modern standards of an international film festival. Events have since been held from 14 to 22 June at Košice's Kunsthalle exhibition space, Kasárne Kulturpark, the old town hall, Kino Úsmev movie theatre, the former tobacco factory of Tabačka Kulturfabrik—now a cultural centre, and at Amfiteáter Košice.

2020–2022

The event was not held in 2020, due to the COVID-19 pandemic. The following year, the organizers held a reduced five-day edition and in 2022, it was cancelled once more, this time owing to a lack of funds.

Award categories
Art Film Fest has several competition categories and awards. The feature film competition is evaluated by a five-member international jury, and the short film competition by a three-member international jury. Experts from various film professions are nominated in advance by the juries.

Blue Angel
 Blue Angel for Best Feature Film – awarded to film producers
 Blue Angel for Best Direction
 Blue Angel for Best Female Performance
 Blue Angel for Best Male Performance
 Blue Angel – prize for best short film, awarded to the director

International competition of feature films over sixty minutes
This competition is aimed at up-and-coming directors—only debuts or second and third films can be submitted.

International competition of short films under thirty minutes
This competition is not limited by genre—feature films, documentaries, animations, and other films can be submitted.

Actor's Mission
This prize, awarded since 1995, is associated with the tradition of attaching a sign with the awardee's name to the Bridge of Fame in Trenčianske Teplice.

Gallery
Numerous Czech, Slovak, and international actors have received the Actor's Mission trophy since the festival's inception in 1993, including Ben Kingsley, Gérard Depardieu, Jeremy Irons, Isabelle Huppert, Geraldine Chaplin, Klaus Maria Brandauer, Erland Josephson, Jacqueline Bisset, Omar Sharif, Jean-Paul Belmondo, Vlastimil Brodský, Iva Janžurová, Zdeněk Svěrák, Josef Abrhám, Jozef Kroner, Juraj Kukura, and Marián Labuda.

This gallery presents a sampling of Actor's Mission memorial plaques on the Bridge of Fame in Trenčianske Teplice.

References

External links

 

Film festivals established in 1993
Film festivals in Slovakia
Art festivals in Slovakia
Culture and Arts in Košice